Gaston Chiquet is a Grower Champagne producer and an original member of Club Trésors de Champagne. The house has 23 hectares in Hautvillers, Dizy, Aÿ, Mareuil-sur-Aÿ, Crugny and Nanteuil-la-Forêt planted to 46% Chardonnay, 20% Pinot Noir and 34% Pinot Meunier.

References

Champagne (wine)
Club Trésors de Champagne